Puthenpurayil Chandrika Thulasi (born 31 August 1991) is an Indian badminton player. She was part of the national team that won the gold medals in 2010 and 2016 South Asian Games, also the women's doubles silver in 2010. Thulasi was the women's singles national champion in 2016, and the gold medalist in 34th National Games.

Achievements

South Asian Games

BWF International 

  BWF International Challenge tournament
  BWF International Series tournament
  BWF Future Series tournament

References

External links
 

1991 births
Living people
Sportspeople from Palakkad
Racket sportspeople from Kerala
Sportswomen from Kerala
21st-century Indian women
21st-century Indian people
Indian female badminton players
Indian national badminton champions
Badminton players at the 2014 Commonwealth Games
Commonwealth Games competitors for India
Badminton players at the 2014 Asian Games
Asian Games bronze medalists for India
Asian Games medalists in badminton
Medalists at the 2014 Asian Games
South Asian Games gold medalists for India
South Asian Games silver medalists for India
South Asian Games medalists in badminton